Peniel E. Joseph is an American scholar, teacher, and public voice on race issues especially the history of the Black power movement. He holds a joint professorship appointment at the LBJ School of Public Affairs and the History Department in at the University of Texas at Austin (UT Austin). Joseph joined UT Austin in 2015 from Tufts University in Massachusetts, where he had founded the school's Center for the Study of Race and Democracy (CSRD). He founded the second Center for the Study of Race and Democracy (CSRD) on the University of Texas campus in 2016, and is director of the center.

Joseph also serves as Vice President of the Board of Directors at the Bayard Rustin Center for Social Justice, an LGBTQIA safe-space, community activist center, and educational enclave dedicated to honoring Bayard Rustin through their mission and good works. At UT–Austin, Joseph holds the Barbara Jordan Chair Professorship in ethics and political values.

Early years
Joseph was born and raised in New York City, New York, United States. His mother, a Haitian immigrant to the United States, was a major influence on his current work. Because of her, Stokely Carmichael (later Kwame Ture) and other related leaders were household names during Joseph's upbringing.

Joseph attended the State University of New York at Stony Brook, where he earned a Bachelor of Arts degree in Africana Studies and European History. He received a Ph.D. in American History from Temple University in 2000.

Career
Joseph is the founder of the "Black Power Studies" subfield of American History and American Civil Rights History, which encompasses interdisciplinary fields such as Africana studies, law and society, women’s and ethnic studies, and political science. He has served on the faculties of the University of Rhode Island, SUNY—Stony Brook University, Brandeis University and Tufts University.

Recognition
According to the Journal of American History in 2010:Over the last few years, by editing a number of important collections, penning several key articles, and writing a fine book, Peniel E. Joseph has emerged as a sort of dean of black power studies. His latest book challenges the conventional dichotomy between “civil rights” and “black power”.

He is the recipient of fellowships from Harvard University's Charles Warren Center and Hutchins Center for African and African American Research; the Woodrow Wilson International Center for Scholars, and the Ford Foundation.

In July 2020, Joseph was appointed a director of the Bayard Rustin Center for Social Justice, an LGBTQIA safe-space community activist center, located in Princeton, NJ.

Publications
 Waiting ‘Til the Midnight Hour: A Narrative History of Black Power in America (2006), . According to WorldCat, the book is held in 1530 libraries.  It was reviewed in The American Historical Review, Journal of African American History, Contemporary Sociology.
 Dark Days, Bright Nights: From Black Power to Barack Obama (2010), . According to WorldCat, held in 1120 libraries. 
 Stokely: A Life (2014), is a biography of Stokely Carmichael, the man who popularized the phrase "black power" and led the Student Nonviolent Coordinating Committee.
 The Sword and the Shield: The Revolutionary Lives of Malcolm X and Martin Luther King Jr. (2020), is a dual biography of Malcolm X and Martin Luther King Jr.
 The Third Reconstruction: America's Struggle for Racial Justice in the Twenty-First Century (2022), 
 The Black Power Movement: Rethinking the Civil Rights-Black Power Era (editor) (2006), . Reviewed in Journal of American History.
 Neighborhood Rebels: Black Power at the Local Level (editor) (2010),

Media appearances
As a national commentator, Joseph has spoken at the 2008 Democratic and Republic National Conventions, PBS's NewsHour with Jim Lehrer and C-SPAN. He has also appeared on NBC's Morning Joe, and the Colbert Report.

References

External links

Rustin Center Board of Directors
"Peniel Joseph: Professor, scholar, racial justice thinker" – in conversation with David Bonbright and Preeta Bansal in conversation at Awakin.org.
Darryl Robertson, "Peniel E. Joseph Explores ‘The Third Reconstruction’ to make sense of today’s tense racial climate", Andscape, September 23, 2022.

Living people
1972 births
21st-century American historians
21st-century American male writers
American male non-fiction writers
American people of Haitian descent
Historians from Massachusetts
People from Somerville, Massachusetts
Stony Brook University alumni
Temple University alumni
Tufts University faculty
University of Rhode Island faculty